The Comorians inhabiting Grande Comore, Anjouan, and Mohéli (86% of the population) share African-Arab origins. Islam is the dominant religion, and Quranic schools for children reinforce its influence. Although Islamic culture is firmly established throughout, a small minority are Christian.

The most common language is Comorian, related to Swahili. French and Arabic also are spoken. About 89% of the population is literate.

The Comoros have had eight censuses since World War II:
 1951
 1956
 1958-09-07: 183,133
 1966-07-06
 Note: in 1974 Mayotte was removed from the Comoros
 1980-09-15: 335,150
 1991-09-15: 446,817
 2003-09-15: 575,660
 2017-12-15: 758,316

The latest official estimate (for 1 July 2020) is 897,219.

Population density figures conceal a great disparity between the republic's most crowded island, Nzwani, which had a density of 772 persons per square kilometer in 2017; Njazidja, which had a density of 331 persons per square kilometer in 2017; and Mwali, where the 2017 population density figure was 178 persons per square kilometer. 
By comparison, estimates of the population density per square kilometer of the Indian Ocean's other island microstates ranged from 241 (Seychelles) to 690 (Maldives) in 1993. Given the rugged terrain of Njazidja and Nzwani, and the dedication of extensive tracts to agriculture on all three islands, population pressures on the Comoros are becoming increasingly critical.

The age structure of the population of the Comoros is similar to that of many developing countries, in that the republic has a very large proportion of young people. In 1989, 46.4 percent of the population was under fifteen years of age, an above-average proportion even for sub-Saharan Africa. The population's rate of growth was a relatively high 3.5 percent per annum in the mid 1980s, up substantially from 2.0 percent in the mid-1970s and 2.1 percent in the mid-1960s.

In 1983 the Abdallah regime borrowed US$2.85 million from the International Development Association to devise a national family planning program. However, Islamic reservations about contraception made forthright advocacy and implementation of birth control programs politically hazardous, and consequently little was done in the way of public policy.

The Comorian population has become increasingly urbanized in recent years. In 1991 the percentage of Comorians residing in cities and towns of more than 5,000 persons was about 30 percent, up from 25 percent in 1985 and 23 percent in 1980. The Comoros' largest cities were the capital, Moroni, with about 30,000 people, and the port city of Mutsamudu, on the island of Nzwani, with about 20,000 people.

Migration among the various islands is important. Natives of Nzwani have settled in significant numbers on less crowded Mwali, causing some social tensions, and many Nzwani also migrate to Maore. In 1977 Maore expelled peasants from Ngazidja and Nzwani who had recently settled in large numbers on the island. Some were allowed to reenter starting in 1981 but solely as migrant labor.

The number of Comorians living abroad has been estimated at between 80,000 and 100,000; during the colonial period, most of them lived in Tanzania, Madagascar, and other parts of Southeast Africa. The number of Comorians residing in Madagascar was drastically reduced after anti-Comorian rioting in December 1976 in Mahajanga, in which at least 1,400 Comorians were killed. As many as 17,000 Comorians left Madagascar to seek refuge in their native land in 1977 alone. About 100,000 Comorians live in France; many of them had gone there for a university education and never returned. Small numbers of Indians, Malagasy, South Africans, and Europeans (mostly French) live on the islands and play an important role in the economy. Most French left after independence in 1975.

Some Persian Gulf countries started buying Comorian citizenship for their stateless bidoon residents and deporting them to Comoros.

90% of the people living in the Comoros are black, and 10% are mixed race, mostly black and white.

Population

UN population projections
UN medium variant projections.

Vital statistics
Statistics :

Fertility and Births
Total Fertility Rate (TFR) (Wanted Fertility Rate) and Crude Birth Rate (CBR):

Structure of the population (DHS 2012) (Males 11 088, Females 12 284 = 23 373) :

Fertility data as of 2012 (DHS Program):

Other demographic statistics
Demographic statistics according to the World Population Review in 2022.

One birth every 19 minutes	
One death every 85 minutes	
One net migrant every 288 minutes	
Net gain of one person every 27 minutes

The following demographic statistics are from the CIA World Factbook.

Population
876,437 (2022 est.)
821,164 (July 2018 est.)
690,948 (July 2006 est.)

Religions
Sunni Muslim 98%, other (including Shia Muslim, Roman Catholic, Jehovah's Witness, Protestant) 2%
note: Sunni Islam is the state religion

Age structure

0-14 years: 36.68% (male 154,853/female 155,602)
15-24 years: 20.75% (male 85,208/female 90,422)
25-54 years: 33.99% (male 136,484/female 151,178)
55-64 years: 4.49% (male 17,237/female 20,781)
65 years and over: 4.08% (male 15,437/female 19,079) (2020 est.) 

0-14 years: 38.54% (male 157,764 /female 158,676)
15-24 years: 19.89% (male 79,133 /female 84,181)
25-54 years: 33.25% (male 129,645 /female 143,408)
55-64 years: 4.34% (male 15,957 /female 19,690)
65 years and over: 3.98% (male 14,881 /female 17,829) (2018 est.)

0–14 years: 42.7% (male 148,009/female 147,038)
15–64 years: 54.3% (male 185,107/female 190,139)
65 years and over: 3% (male 9,672/female 10,983) (2006 est.)

Median age
total: 20.9 years. Country comparison to the world: 188th
male: 20.2 years
female: 21.5 years (2020 est.)

total: 20.2 years. Country comparison to the world: 188th
male: 19.5 years 
female: 20.8 years (2018 est.)

Total: 18.6 years
Male: 18.4 years
Female: 18.9 years (2006 est.)

Population growth rate
1.37% (2022 est.) Country comparison to the world: 70th
1.57% (2018 est.) Country comparison to the world: 66th
2.87% (2006 est.)

Birth rate
22.52 births/1,000 population (2022 est.) Country comparison to the world: 55th
25.3 births/1,000 population (2018 est.) Country comparison to the world: 49th

Death rate
6.55 deaths/1,000 population (2022 est.) Country comparison to the world: 135th
7.1 deaths/1,000 population (2018 est.) Country comparison to the world: 125th

Net migration rate
-2.25 migrant(s)/1,000 population (2022 est.) Country comparison to the world: 172nd
-2.4 migrant(s)/1,000 population (2017 est.) Country comparison to the world: 168th

Total fertility rate
2.78 children born/woman (2022 est.) Country comparison to the world: 56th
3.21 children born/woman (2018 est.) Country comparison to the world: 46th

Mother's mean age at first birth
23 years (2012 est.)
note: median age at first birth among women 25-49

Contraceptive prevalence rate
19.4% (2012)

Dependency ratios
total dependency ratio: 75.5 (2015 est.)
youth dependency ratio: 70.5 (2015 est.)
elderly dependency ratio: 5.1 (2015 est.)
potential support ratio: 19.7 (2015 est.)

Urbanization
urban population: 29.9% of total population (2022)
rate of urbanization: 2.97% annual rate of change (2020-25 est.)

urban population: 29% of total population (2018)
rate of urbanization: 2.87% annual rate of change (2015-20 est.)

Sex ratio
At birth: 1.03 male(s)/female
Under 15 years: 1.01 male(s)/female
15–64 years: 0.97 male(s)/female
65 years and over: 0.88 male(s)/female
Total population: 0.99 male(s)/female (2006 est.)

Life expectancy at birth
total population: 67.2 years. Country comparison to the world: 192nd
male: 64.93 years
female: 69.54 years (2022 est.)

Total population: 62.33 years
Male: 60 years
Female: 64.72 years (2006 est.)

HIV/AIDS
Adult prevalence rate: 0.12% (2001 est.)
People living with HIV/AIDS: NA
Deaths: NA

Nationality
Noun: Comorian(s)
Adjective: Comorian

Languages

Arabic (official), French (official), Comorian (official)

Literacy
definition: age 15 and over can read and write
total population: 58.8%
male: 64.6%
female: 53% (2018)

Definition: age 15 and over who can read and write
total population: 77.8% (2015 est.)
male: 81.8% (2015 est.)
female: 73.7% (2015 est.)

Total population: 56.5%
Male: 63.6%
Female: 49.3% (2003 est.)

School life expectancy (primary to tertiary education)
total: 11 years (2014)
male: 11 years (2014)
female: 11 years (2014)

See also
 Demographics of Mayotte
 Islam in the Comoros

References

Attribution:

 
Society of the Comoros